Nakul Dev Mahajan (born 15 September 1975) is an Indian-American Bollywood dancer and choreographer best known for his choreography on So You Think You Can Dance. He is the founder and artistic director of NDM Bollywood Dance Productions and Studios, a Bollywood dance company based in Artesia, California. Mahajan has served as a talent show judge for reality television productions. His dance choreography is prominent in the Disney Junior animated series Mira, Royal Detective.

Early life and background
Born in Agra, India, in a Punjabi family, Mahajan and his family immigrated to the United States in the 1960s. Mahajan began formal dance training at age 17, and graduated from the University of California, Riverside with a bachelor's degree in Sociology and Dance in 2002.

Career
  
The work of Nakul Dev Mahajan has been influenced by classical indian dances and Western dance styles (hip-hop, Latin and jazz). As a result of his efforts to teach and promote the Bollywood dance style, Mahajan has been called Hollywood’s Favorite Bollywood Choreographer and an Ambassador of Bollywood Dance. 

Mahajan appeared as a guest star (dancer) in season 3, episode 6 (Diwali) of The Office (TV sitcom), led a Bollywood Dance instructional session prior to the 81st Academy Awards (2009), and choreographed a flash mob style Bollywood scene for an episode of Fuller House (TV series) (2016). Sonia Singh and Mahajan co-authored the script for One Man Bollywood Show, a 2009 stage production performed by Mahajan.

In 2011, Mahajan was the recipient of the University of California, Riverside Outstanding Young Alumnus Award. Mahajan was selected to the "Wall of the World" panel of judges for CBS' The World's Best (reality talent competition). 

In 2015, the World Choreography Award (Digital Media Format) was awarded for Check Yourself, a collaboration between Mahajan, Chucky Klapow, Paula Abdul, and Renee Ritchie.

Dance Studios
In 2003, Mahajan founded NDM Bollywood Dance Productions and Studios, the first Bollywood dance school in the U.S.; the school has since served over 3000 students. 

In 2015, 430 students and 20 members of the school's dance troupe performed Bollywood Travels (the annual student recital) for a total of 2700 audience members. Mahajan serves as a guest instructor in the faculty of the Broadway Dance Center.

Television

So You Think You Can Dance (U.S., 2008-2019)
Nakul Dev Mahajan's choreography introduced the Bollywood Dance style to the stage of So You Think You Can Dance (reality TV show) in Season 4. Katee Shean and Joshua Allen's performance of Mahajan's routine for Season 4 was in YouTube's "Most Viewed" list for one week, and was included in BuzzFeed's 2014 25 Best 'So You Think You Can Dance' Routines of all Time listing.  In subsequent seasons of the show, Bollywood performances were included regularly (see summary table, below).

Choreography for So You Think You Can Dance (U.S.)

So You Think You Can Dance (Canada, 2008)
Mahajan choreographed the group dance performance of  Nagada, Nagada from Jab We Met in So You Think You Can Dance Canada (season 1).

Superstars of Dance 
Mahajan coached team India at the Superstars of Dance on the NBC Network and choreographed six remaining crews at the 2009 ABDCrews (season 4).

Dance India Dance 
Mahajan was selected as a judge for the 2015 edition of Dance India Dance North America (filmed in Mumbai).

Dance Moms 
For the Season 6, Episode 5 edition of the reality TV show Dance Moms, Mahajan coached the Abby Lee Dance Company Team, when Abby Lee Miller unexpectedly failed to attend practice sessions and competition.

The World's Best 
Selected to the Wall of the World, a panel of global entertainment experts for The World's Best, a reality talent competition produced by CBS, Mahajan served as a judge.

Cancer

Diagnosis
A 2012 diagnosis of Stage 2 testicular cancer and subsequent chemotherapy treatment interrupted Mahajan's career.

Check Yourself
In 2014, Mahajan choreographed a section of Paula Abdul's performance in Check Yourself, a breast cancer PSA (public service announcement) production by Avon Products. Abdul, Mahajan, Chucky Klapow, and Renee Ritchie received a 2015 World Choreography Award for this work, in the category Digital Format.

White House Diwali Celebration 
Following a tradition started by George W. Bush in 2003, an annual Diwali celebration takes place at the White House. For the 2013 edition of the White House Diwali celebration, First Lady Michelle Obama hosted a Bollywood dance workshop instructed and choreographed by Mahajan. A photo of Michelle Obama dancing a Bollywood routine alongside Mahajan was cited as one of the top White House photos of 2013.

Miss America 2014 Pageant 
Mahajan choreographed the Bollywood-Indian classical dance fusion routine performed by Nina Davuluri (2014 Miss America and the first Miss America of Indian descent) at the Miss America 2014 Talent competition; the routine was set to the song Dhoom Taana, from the film Om Shanti Om. Davuluri's performance of this routine marked the first time a Bollywood dance routine had been performed on the Miss America stage.

Mahajan was named to The American Bazaar's Top 10 Indian American Entertainers of 2013.

Film 
As associate choreographer, Mahajan choreographed the Bollywood scenes in the 2019 film High Strung Free Dance (a sequel to High Strung).

Animation

Mira, Royal Detective
In 2019, Mahajan embraced the opportunity to work as the Choreographer and Indian Dance Consultant for the production of Mira, Royal Detective. Described as  "an animated mystery-adventure series for preschoolers, inspired by the cultures and customs of India" , the Disney Junior series features original song and dance in each episode. Tasked with showcasing the diversity of Indian culture through choreography, Mahajan created original dance sequences for the cast of animated human and animal characters, ensuring representation of northern and southern Indian styles of dance, as well as Bollywood productions.

Mickey Mouse Mixed-Up Adventures
In two episodes of Disney Television Animation's computer-animated children's television series Mickey Mouse Mixed-Up Adventures, the characters embark on adventures that showcase Indian culture on a Bollywood film set and a trip to New Delhi. The Bollywood and Indian Dance choreography for these episodes was performed by Mahajan.

Awards
 2011 University of California, Riverside Outstanding Young Alumnus Award
 2015 India Empire Awards: Excellence in Performing Arts
 2015 World Choreography Award (Category: Digital Format), with Paula Abdul, Chucky Klapow, Renee Ritchie

References

External links
 NDM Bollywood Dance Productions and Studios

Living people
1975 births
Indian dance teachers
American choreographers
So You Think You Can Dance choreographers
Participants in American reality television series
University of California, Riverside alumni
American people of Punjabi descent
Indian choreographers
People from Agra
American male artists of Indian descent
American male artists
American artists
Dancers from Uttar Pradesh